Ronald Eugene Rosser (October 24, 1929 – August 26, 2020) was a United States Army soldier who received the United States military's highest decoration, the Medal of Honor, for his actions in the Korean War.

Military service
Born on October 24, 1929, in Columbus, Ohio, Rosser was the oldest of seventeen children. He joined the United States Army in 1946 at age 17 shortly after World War II for a three-year term of service. After one of his brothers was killed in the early stages of the Korean War, he re-enlisted from Crooksville, Ohio, in 1951 as a way of getting revenge. Initially stationed in Japan, Rosser requested to be sent into combat and was then deployed to Korea with the heavy mortar company of the 38th Infantry Regiment, 2nd Infantry Division.

On January 12, 1952, Rosser, by then a corporal, was acting as a forward observer with Company L's lead platoon during an assault on a heavily fortified hill near Ponggilli. When the unit came under heavy fire, Rosser went forward three times and attacked the hostile positions alone, each time returning to friendly lines to gather more ammunition before charging the hill again. Although wounded himself, he helped carry injured soldiers to safety once withdrawal became necessary. For these actions, Rosser was awarded the Medal of Honor. Rosser earned these badges: Combat Infantry Badge, Glider Badge, Master Parachutist Badge, Pathfinder badge, Parachute Rigger, Army Recruiter Badge.  

Rosser returned to the United States in May 1952 and was formally presented with the Medal of Honor by President Harry Truman a month later, on June 27, 1952.

On September 20, 1966, another of Rosser's brothers, PFC Gary Edward Rosser, USMC, was killed in action, this time in the Vietnam War. Rosser requested a combat assignment in Vietnam but was rejected and subsequently retired from the army soon after.

Awards and decorations

Medal of Honor citation
Rosser's official Medal of Honor citation reads:

Personal life
Rosser resided in West Palm Beach, Florida, for thirty years. While he lived in Florida he was a letter carrier for the United States Postal Service. He lived in Roseville, Ohio. He was the father of Pamela [nee Rosser] Lovell.

Rosser served on the advisory board of the Motts Military Museum in Groveport, Ohio.

Rosser died on August 26, 2020, in Bumpus Mills, Tennessee.

See also

List of Korean War Medal of Honor recipients

References

External links

1929 births
2020 deaths
United States Army soldiers
United States Army personnel of the Korean War
Korean War recipients of the Medal of Honor
United States Army Medal of Honor recipients
People from West Palm Beach, Florida
People from Columbus, Ohio
People from Roseville, Ohio
Military personnel from Ohio
Recipients of the Order of Military Merit (Korea)